Amalia Arvaniti is a Greek linguist and Professor and Chair of English Language and Linguistics at Radboud University. She is known for her works on phonetics, phonology, and prosody, particularly intonation and speech rhythm. Arvaniti is a former editor of the Journal of the International Phonetic Association (2015-2019).

References

External links
Personal website

Phonologists
Living people
Year of birth missing (living people)
Women linguists
Alumni of the University of Cambridge
Academic staff of Radboud University Nijmegen
Linguists from Greece
Academics of the University of Kent
University of California, San Diego faculty
Academic staff of the University of Cyprus